Nóra Görbe (born 3 September 1956) is a Hungarian pop singer and actress.

Life
 She is the daughter of legendary film actor János Görbe. 
 She considered becoming a ballet dancer before turning to acting. 
 Although having appeared in many films, television films and plays, she is most famous for her signature role as karate expert detective Linda Veszprémi in the crime-comedy series "Linda" (1984–1989).
 She has two children with producer and creator of "Linda" György Gát, her former partner: writer Anna Gát (b. 1983) and Márton (b. 1989).
 Besides being an actress, she also recorded a number of albums and toured extensively in the 1980s and 1990s. She released children's albums as well.
 She has recently retired from the limelight, although a retro wave made her a press favorite after the re-run of the show.
 See also Hungarian pop

References

External links
 Unofficial Nóra Görbe fanpage with photos and information
 
 Information on "Linda" :hu:Linda (tévésorozat)

1956 births
Living people
20th-century Hungarian women singers
Hungarian film actresses
Hungarian television actresses
People from Debrecen
20th-century Hungarian actresses
21st-century Hungarian women singers
21st-century Hungarian actresses